Kaoru Hoshino (21 September 1947 – 21 November 2022) was a Japanese racing driver.
He was active in the Toyota works team Toms from its inception, driving the Toyota Corolla and Toyota Starlet. He was mainly active in touring car racing, and also competed in the All Japan Touring Car Championship with the Toyota Supra and Toyota Corolla Levin. He continued to compete in the Super Taikyus and the All Japan GT Championship, and in 1995, in the GT2 class of the All Japan GT Championship, he teamed up with Yoshimi Ishibashi to win the series championship with a Nissan Skyline.

Kaoru was best known for being involved in Tetsuya Ota's accident when he was rear-ended by Tomohiko Sunako's Porsche, his tire came off and he was stuck in the pit lane when Ota hit Sunako Kaoru had just touched the wall a little bit. The tire came off and also damaged his car's rear end due to the touch with Sunako.

Hoshino died on 25 November 2022, at the age of 75.

Racing record

Complete JGTC results
(key) (Races in bold indicate pole position) (Races in italics indicate fastest lap)

24 Hours of Le Mans results

References

1947 births
2022 deaths
Japanese racing drivers
IMSA GT Championship drivers
24 Hours of Le Mans drivers
World Sportscar Championship drivers
Japanese Touring Car Championship drivers
24 Hours of Spa drivers
TOM'S drivers
20th-century Japanese people